Sedjes is an ancient Egyptian cartouche "name" for a king (pharaoh), who is said to have ruled during the 3rd Dynasty (Old Kingdom period). The lexeme appears only once, in the Abydos King List, as cartouche No.18. It is presented as if it were the name of the direct follower of king Sekhemkhet (here named Teti) and the direct predecessor of king Neferkara I.

In the 19th century it was thought by Egyptologists and Historians to be the name of a king, because the scribes had placed the word sedjes inside a royal cartouche. But as knowledge about Ancient Egyptian phrasing and grammars advanced, scholars realized its true meaning. Sedjes means "omitted" or "missing" and the scribes used the word as a pseudonym replacing a now illegible name of a king. They encircled it with a royal cartouche to mark it as a king's name, but following generations of scribes erroneously took it as the actual birth name of the to-be listed king. A similar case can be observed with the ominous cartouche name Hudjefa, also used as a pseudonym for missing royal names. Today, it is passionately disputed, which king of 3rd Dynasty was meant to be denoted in cartouche No.18.

References

Pharaohs of the Third Dynasty of Egypt